The Everest ER is a seasonal tent-based medical clinic at the Everest base camp (17,600 ft/5350m) founded in 2003 by Dr. Luanne Freer, a volunteer physician for the nonprofit Himalayan Rescue Association (HRA) in Nepal and Associate Medical Director of Medcor, Inc.Volunteer doctors provide  altitude-experienced health care and preventative education to the climbing community, their support staff and trekking-through public in base camp, using proceeds from this care to subsidize free/low cost health care for the Sherpa people of the Khumbu region of Nepal.

Staffed by volunteer physicians from all over the world, the ER works to stabilize patients for evacuation and descent or, in many cases, to definitively treat the illness or injury. Ninety percent of Everest ER patients are climbers or their support staff; the remaining 10% are trekkers-through or media and just over half of the patients every year are native Nepali.

Everest ER has struggled to remain fiscally solvent. The clinic has accumulated some donated clinic supplies and equipment, including new custom-made tents, and solar panels to enable power to the equipment with clean, quiet, renewable energy. The 501C-3 non-profit organization Himalayan Rescue Association - USA (HRA-USA) was created in 2005 to help fund the clinic, a corporate sponsor (Medcor, Inc.) created and continues to manage the website and production companies filmed documentaries about the clinic in 2004, 2006, and 2007, which increased exposure to potential sponsors. The Everest ER has been well received and relied upon by more teams in the subsequent seasons – in the first 9 seasons the clinic logged over 2500 patient visits.

References

External links
 

Medical and health organisations based in Nepal
Charities based in Nepal
2003 establishments in Nepal